Dushinsky, Dushinski, Duschinsky, are transliteration variants of the Polish surname Duszyński.

Notable people with the surname include:

Dushinsky (Hasidic dynasty)

People
Michael Pinto-Duschinsky (born 1943), British political consultant and writer
Simon Dushinsky (born 1972), American real estate developer
Ted Dushinski (1943 – 2005), Canadian footballer
Wilhelm Duschinsky (1860–1924), Austrian philologist
Yisroel Moshe Dushinsky (1921–2003), second Rebbe of the Dushinsky Hasidic dynasty
Yosef Tzvi Dushinsky (first Dushinsky rebbe) (1867–1948), first Rebbe of Dushinsky Hasidic dynasty
Yosef Tzvi Dushinsky (third Dushinsky rebbe), third Rebbe of the Dushinsky Hasidic dynasty

See also

Jewish surnames
Yiddish-language surnames